Drăgotești is a commune in Dolj County, Oltenia, Romania with a population of 2,630 people. It is composed of six villages: Benești, Bobeanu, Buzduc, Drăgotești, Popânzălești and Viișoara.

References

Communes in Dolj County
Localities in Oltenia